Bettina Rausch (born 25 December 1979) is an Austrian politician. Rausch was from 2008 to 2013 a member of the Federal Council for Lower Austria and from 2013 to 2018 a member of the Lower Austrian State Diet. Since 2018 she serves as the president of the Political Academy of the Austrian People's Party.

References 

1979 births
Living people
Members of the Federal Council (Austria)
21st-century Austrian women politicians
21st-century Austrian politicians
Austrian People's Party politicians
People from Scheibbs District